Nicolás Carlos Bellizia Aboaf (born 19 November 1969) is a Mexican politician from the Institutional Revolutionary Party. From 2009 to 2012 he served as Deputy of the LXI Legislature of the Mexican Congress representing Tabasco.

References

Legisladores locales

1969 births
Living people
Politicians from Tabasco
Institutional Revolutionary Party politicians
21st-century Mexican politicians
Alumni of the University of Liverpool
Members of the Congress of Tabasco
Municipal presidents in Tabasco
Deputies of the LXI Legislature of Mexico
Members of the Chamber of Deputies (Mexico) for Tabasco